Sheikh Sulaiman bin Abdulaziz Al Rajhi (Arabic :الشيخ سليمان بن عبدالعزيز الراجحي born 1929) is a Saudi Arabian corporate figure and billionaire. As of 2011, his wealth was estimated by Forbes to be $5.9 billion, making him the 169th richest person in the world.

He received the 2012 King Faisal International Prize for dedicating half his fortune to charity, starting an Islamic bank, supporting charity work and implementing effective national projects.

Biography
Sulaiman Al Rajhi was born in Al Bukairiyah, located in Al Qassim province in Saudi Arabia, and grew up in the Najd desert where he and his brother Saleh began their business by charging money for pilgrims taking camel caravans across the desert to the cities of Mecca and Medina.

Sulaiman Abdulaziz Al Rajhi holds the largest individual stake in his family's Al Rajhi Bank, which has consistently reported the most profitable operations amongst all of Saudi Arabia's banking groups.  A co-founder of the bank,  with the older brother, Saleh, he is currently the chairman of what is nationally recognized as the Tadawul's most venerable institution.

The Al Rajhi brothers’ business growth and expansion was fed by the flood of migrant workers to Saudi Arabia during the 1970s oil boom. The Al Rajhis helped them send their earnings home to places like Indonesia and Pakistan. In 1983, the brothers won permission to open Saudi Arabia’s first Islamic bank, one that would observe religious tenets such as a ban on interest.

The Al Rajhi family continues to be Al Rajhi Bank's majority shareholders though Sulaiman and his brothers have diversified family investments into gypsum, agriculture, steel, and other industrial sectors.

His higher educational degree was elementary degree. He lives in Saudi Arabia and has at least 23 children.

Philanthropy 
The Al Rajhi family is considered, by most in Saudi Arabia, as the country's wealthiest non-royals, and among the world's leading philanthropists.

He established the Sulaiman Al Rajhi University in his hometown, a non profit university. The university's main focus is on health and Islamic banking, but contains other faculties as well.

In May 2011, he announced he was donating most of his $7.7 billion fortune to charity.

See also 
 Saleh Abdulaziz Al Rajhi
 Naif Saleh Alrajhi

References

Notes

Sources
 Profile: Sulaiman Abdul Aziz al-Rajhi
 Saleh Abdul Aziz Al Rajhi

External links
 Sulaiman Al Rajhi University.

20th-century Saudi Arabian businesspeople
21st-century Saudi Arabian businesspeople
1929 births
Living people
People from Al-Qassim Province
Saudi Arabian bankers
Saudi Arabian billionaires
Saudi Arabian philanthropists